Mboi or MboI may be,

Mboi language
Ben Mboi
Nafsiah Mboi
MboI a well-known restriction enzyme from the bacteria Moraxella bovis, used in biotechnology.